The 2016 Syracuse Orange football team represented Syracuse University in the 2016 NCAA Division I FBS football season. The Orange were led by first year head coach Dino Babers and played their home games at the Carrier Dome. They were members of the Atlantic Division of the Atlantic Coast Conference. They finished the season 4–8, 2–6 in ACC play to finish in a tie for sixth place in the Atlantic Division.

Schedule

Schedule Source:

Game summaries

Colgate

Louisville

South Florida

at UConn

vs. Notre Dame

at Wake Forest

Virginia Tech

at Boston College

at Clemson

NC State

Florida State

at Pittsburgh

References

Syracuse
Syracuse Orange football seasons
Syracuse Orange football